The Burden of Mules is the debut studio album by English post-punk band The Wolfgang Press. It was released on 1 August 1983, through record label 4AD.

Track listing

Critical reception 

AllMusic's review was negative, calling the album "impenetrable" and some tracks "so morose and vehement as to verge on self-parody". Trouser Press called it "dark and cacophonous; an angry, intense slab of post-punk gloom that is best left to its own (de)vices."

Personnel 
 The Wolfgang Press

 Andrew Gray – guitar (tracks A1, A4 and B2), percussion (tracks A1 and B2), drums (tracks A3 and B1), sleeve photography
 David Steiner – drums (track B1)
 Michael Allen – drums (tracks A1 and B1), percussion (tracks A1, A2, A4–A6 and B2), bass guitar (tracks A2–A6, B2 and B3), vocals (tracks A2–A5 and B1–B3), synthesizer (tracks A2 and A5), piano (tracks A6, B2 and B3), organ (track A6), drum loops (track B2), cymbal and saxophone (track B3), production
 Mark Cox – synthesizer (tracks A2 and A4–B3), percussion (tracks A1, A2, A4–A6), clarinet (tracks A2, A5 and B3), "noises" (tracks A3, B1 and B2), pixiephone and chimes (tracks A2 and A4), piano (tracks A2 and A5), organ (tracks A1 and B1), "scratches" and whistling (track A6), bass guitar (track A3), production
 Richard Thomas – drums (tracks A2, A4–A6 and B3), flute and piano (track B3)

 Technical

 John Madden – engineering, production

References

External links 
 
 The Burden of Mules at the official 4AD Records website

1983 debut albums
The Wolfgang Press albums